Sandro Schendl (born 19 March 2003) is an Austrian professional footballer who plays as a winger for Sturm Graz.

Career
Schendl is a youth product of Mischendorf/Neuhaus and SV Güssing, before joining the academy of Sturm Graz in 2014. He started training with their reserves in 2020. On 25 November 2020, Schendl signed his first professional contract with the club. He made his senior debut with Sturm Graz in a 3–1 Austrian Football Bundesliga loss to RB Salzburg on 4 April 2021.

International career
Schendl is a youth international for Austria, having most recently represented the Austria U19s.

References

External links
 
 OEFB Profile

2003 births
Living people
People from Güssing
Footballers from Burgenland
Austrian footballers
Austria youth international footballers
SK Sturm Graz players
Austrian Football Bundesliga players
Austrian Regionalliga players
Association football wingers